The Shehbaz Sharif ministry was formed on 10 April 2022, after Sharif was nominated as candidate for Prime Minister by opposition parties following a vote of no confidence in incumbent prime minister Imran Khan during the 2020–2022 Pakistani political crises.

He took oath as the Prime Minister of Pakistan on 11 April 2022. At the time of appointment, he had the majority 85 seats in the ruling alliance of 179 MNA from eight political parties and independent candidates.

Cabinet 
On 19 April 2022, the cabinet was formed, with 37 members taking the oath. Several more members joined the cabinet over the next few days.

As of March 2023, it consisted of 34 Federal Ministers, 7 Ministers of State, 4 Advisers to the Prime Minister and 39 Special Assistants to the Prime Minister. If Advisers and Special Assistants included, the cabinet is reportedly the largest in Pakistan's history. On this basis, the cabinet has been criticised as bloated and unaffordable, given the ongoing economic crisis. In a February 2023 article reporting on further appointments, The News International noted the high number of special assistants serving without portfolio. It further suggested these members were likely appointed in order to "please the appointees or their unknown recommenders." While advisers and special assistants are not officially cabinet members, and many do not claim a salary, they still enjoy the rank and status of cabinet members.

There are 19 SAPMs without any particular portfolio listed on the official website of the Cabinet Division, as well as Federal Minister Without Portfolio Mian Javed Latif.

Federal Ministers

Minister of State

Advisors

Special Assistants to the Prime Minister

References

Pakistani federal ministries
2022 establishments in Pakistan
Cabinets established in 2022
Current governments
Ministry